Erodium chrysanthum, the yellow heron's bill, is a species of flowering plant in the family Geraniaceae, native to central and southern Greece. The flowers are a pale yellow, or rarely a pale pink. A dioecious perennial, it cultivation it is hardy in USDA zones 6 through 8, and is recommended for rock gardens, trough gardens, and borders.

References

chrysanthum
Garden plants of Europe
Endemic flora of Greece
Plants described in 1792